Rutana Province is one of the 18 provinces of Burundi.

It contains the Kagera waterfalls, and the Nyakazu Fault.

History 
Rutana Province was originally created on 26 September 1960 as part of national political and administrative reforms initiated by the Belgian colonial administration in Ruanda-Urundi. In 1962 Burundi became independent. The new constitution reduced the number of provinces and Rutana was merged into Bururi Province and Ruyigi Province.

Communes
It is divided administratively into the following communes:

 Commune of Bukemba
 Commune of Giharo
 Commune of Gitanga
 Commune of Mpinga-Kayove
 Commune of Musongati
 Commune of Rutana

References

Works cited 
 

 
Provinces of Burundi